Henry Roussel (1875–1946), also known as Henry Roussell, was a French silent film actor, film director and screenwriter best known for his silent films of the 1910s and 1920s.

He starred in well over 40 films between 1912 and 1939.

Selected filmography
 The Last Pardon (1913)
 The Cameo (1913)
 The Gaieties of the Squadron (1913)
 The Corsican Brothers (1917)
 Imperial Violets (1924)
 The Promised Land (1925)
 The Farewell Waltz (1928)
 Les Nouveaux Messieurs (1929)
 Fun in the Barracks (1932)
 Imperial Violets (1932)
 Orange Blossom (1932)
 Imperial Violets (1952, original story)

External links 

1875 births
1946 deaths
French film directors
Silent film directors
French male silent film actors
French male film actors
French male screenwriters
20th-century French screenwriters
Silent film screenwriters
People from Bayonne
20th-century French male actors
20th-century French male writers